Savanette is a commune in the Lascahobas Arrondissement, in the Centre department of Haiti. It has 29,717 inhabitants.

References

Populated places in Centre (department)
Communes of Haiti